is a Prefectural Natural Park in Iwate Prefecture, Japan. Established in 1961, the park is wholly within the municipality of Hanamaki.

References

External links

 Map of Hanamaki Onsenkyō Prefectural Natural Park 
Hanamaki city official home page 

Parks and gardens in Iwate Prefecture
Protected areas established in 1961
1961 establishments in Japan
Hanamaki, Iwate